This is the list of banks which are listed as Scheduled Banks (India) under second schedule of RBI Act, 1934.

Commercial banks

Public Sector Banks (PSBs) 

There are 12 public sector banks as of 1 March 2023

Private-sector banks 

At present, there are 21 private banks in India, as of 1 March 2023.

Regional Rural Banks (RRBs) 

There are 43 regional rural banks in India as of 1 November 2020.

Foreign banks 
Foreign banks in India as on July 14, 2020 - Branch/WOS/Representative form of presence as per RBI:

Foreign banks operating as wholly owned subsidiary in India 

List of notable banks which are incorporated outside India and are operating wholly owned subsidiary in India:

Foreign banks with branches in India 

List of notable banks which are incorporated outside India and are operating branches in India:

Foreign banks with representative offices 

List of notable foreign banks with representative offices in India:

Small finance banks

Payments banks

Co-operative banks

State Co-operative Banks (SCBs)

In India, at present, there are total 34 State Co-Operative banks.

 Jharkhand state cooperative bank ltd.
 The Kerala State Co-operative Bank Ltd.
 The Andaman and Nicobar State Co-operative Bank Ltd.
 The Andhra Pradesh State Co-operative Bank Ltd.
 The Arunachal Pradesh State co-operative Apex Bank Ltd.
 The Assam Co-operative Apex Bank Ltd.
 The Bihar State Co-operative Bank Ltd.
 The Chandigarh State Co-operative Bank Ltd.
 The Chhattisgarh Rajya Sahakari Bank.
 The Chhattisgarh RajyaSahakari Bank Maryadit
 The Delhi State Co-operative Bank Ltd.
 The Goa State Co-operative Bank Ltd.
 The Gujarat State Co-operative Bank Ltd.
 The Haryana State Co-opertive Apex Bank Ltd.
 The Himachal Pradesh State Co-operative Bank Ltd.
 The Jammu and Kashmir State Co-operative Bank Ltd.
 The Karnataka State Co-operative Apex Bank Ltd.
 The Madhya Pradesh Rajya Sahakari Bank Maryadit
 The Maharashtra State Co-operative Bank Ltd.
 The Manipur State Co-operative Bank Ltd.
 The Meghalaya Co-operative Apex Bank Ltd.
 The Mizoram Co-operative Apex Bank Ltd.
 The Nagaland State Co-operative Bank Ltd.
 The Orissa State Co-operative Bank Ltd.
 The Pondichery State Co-opertive Bank Ltd.
 The Punjab State Co-operative Bank Ltd.
 The Rajasthan State Co-operative Bank Ltd.
 The Sikkim State Co-operative Bank Ltd.
 The Tamil Nadu State Apex Co-operative Bank Ltd.
 The Telangana State Cooperative Apex Bank Ltd.
 The Tripura State Co-operative Bank Ltd.
 The Uttar Pradesh Co-operative Bank Ltd.
 The Uttaranchal Rajya Sahakari Bank Ltd.
 The West Bengal State Co-operative Bank Ltd.

Urban Co-operative Banks (UCBs)
In India, at present, there are total 53 scheduled Urban Co-Operative banks in India.

 Abhyudaya Co-operative Bank Ltd.
 Ahmedabad Mercantile Co-Op Bank Ltd.
 Amanath Co-operative Bank Ltd.
 Andhra Pradesh Mahesh Co-Op Urban Bank Ltd.
 Bassein Catholic Co-operative Bank Ltd.
 Bharat Co-operative Bank (Mumbai) Ltd.
 Bharati Sahakari Bank Limited.
 Bombay Mercantile Co-operative Bank Limited
Buldana Urban Cooperative Credit Society
 Charminar Co-operative Urban Bank Ltd.
 Citizen Credit Co-operative Bank Ltd.
 Cosmos Co-operative Bank Ltd.
 Dombivli Nagari Sahakari Bank Ltd.
 Darrusalam Co-operative Bank Ltd.
 Goa Urban Co-operative Bank Limited.
 Gopinath Patil Parsik Janata Sahakari Bank Ltd.
 Greater Bombay Co-operative Bank Limited
 Indian Mercantile Co-operative Bank Ltd.
 Jalgaon Janata Sahakari Bank Ltd.
 Janakalyan Sahakari Bank Ltd.
 Janalaxmi Co-operative Bank Ltd.
 Janata Sahakari Bank Ltd.
 Kallappanna Awade Ichalkaranji Janata Sahakari Bank Ltd.
 Kalupur Commercial Co-Op. Bank Ltd.
 Kalyan Janata Sahakari Bank Ltd.
 Karad Urban Co-operative Bank Ltd.
 Madhavpura Mercantile Cooperative Bank Ltd.
 Mahanagar Co-operative Bank Ltd.
 Mapusa Urban Co-operative Bank of Goa Ltd.
 Mehsana Urban Co-Op Bank Ltd.
 Nagar Urban Co-operative Bank Ltd.
 Nagpur Nagrik Sahakari Bank Ltd.
 Nasik Merchant's Co-operative Bank Ltd.
 New India Co-operative Bank Ltd.
 NKGSB Co-operative Bank Ltd.
 Nutan Nagarik Sahakari Bank Ltd.
 Pravara Sahakari Bank Ltd.
 Punjab and Maharashtra Co-operative Bank Ltd.
 Rajkot Nagrik Sahakari Bank Ltd.
 Rohtak Co-Operative Bank Ltd.
 Rupee Co-operative Bank Ltd.
 Sangli Urban Co-operative Bank Ltd.,
 Saraswat Co-operative Bank Ltd.
 Sardar Bhiladwala Pardi Peoples Coop Bank Ltd.
 Shamrao Vithal Co-operative Bank Ltd.
 Shikshak Sahakari Bank Ltd.
 Solapur Janata Sahakari Bank Ltd.
 The Sonipat Urban Co-operative Bank Ltd
 Surat Peoples Coop Bank Ltd.
 Thane Bharat Sahakari Bank Ltd.
 Thane Janata Sahakari Bank
 The Akola Janata Commercial Co-operative Bank Ltd.
 The Akola Urban Co-operative Bank Ltd.
 The Panipat Urban Co-operative Bank Ltd.
 The Kapol Co-operative Bank Ltd.
 The Khamgaon Urban Co-operative Bank Ltd.
 Vasavi Coop Urban Bank Limited.
 Vidyasagar cooperative bank limited, midnapore.
 Zoroastrian Co-operative Bank Ltd.

Local Area Banks

Local Area Banks are non-scheduled banks. They were set up with the twin objectives of providing an institutional mechanism for promoting rural and semi-urban savings and for providing credit for viable economic activities in local areas. They were established as Public Limited Companies in the private sector. They are promoted either by individuals, corporates, trusts or societies. The promoter's contribution should be at least . Local Area Banks can operate and open branches in a maximum of 3 geographically contiguous districts. They are governed by the provisions of the Reserve Bank of India Act, 1934, the Banking Regulation Act, 1949 and other relevant statutes. They are to be registered as Public Limited Companies under the Companies Act 1956. Since they are non-scheduled banks, they cannot borrow funds from the Reserve Bank of India, like other scheduled commercial banks.

List of Local Area Banks:

See also

Banking in India
Defunct banks of India
Indian Financial System Code
 List of largest banks
 List of companies of India
 List of financial regulatory authorities by country
 Make in India
Reserve Bank of India

References

External links
 

Banks
India

ICICI Bank Headquarters: https://www.helloscholar.in/list-of-indian-banks/